Marco Valotti (born 13 November 1995) is an Italian footballer who currently plays for Folgore Caratese as a forward.

Career
Valotti made his professional debut with Brescia on 9 November 2013 against Avellino in a Serie B game. He came in as a 63rd-minute substitute for Vítor Saba in a 0-2 away defeat.

On 6 February 2014 Valotti signed a new -year contract with Brescia.

On 2 July 2015 Valotti was signed by Renate in a temporary deal.

Career statistics

References

External links
 
 

1995 births
Living people
Italian footballers
Italy youth international footballers
Serie B players
Serie C players
Serie D players
Brescia Calcio players
U.S. Catanzaro 1929 players
Association football forwards
Virtus Francavilla Calcio players